Little Mo may refer to:

Maureen Connolly, American tennis player nicknamed "Little Mo"
Little Mo (film), a made-for-television biopic about Connolly, starring Glynnis O'Connor
Little Mo Mitchell, a character from the UK television series EastEnders
Little Missouri River (Arkansas), a river in Arkansas, U.S.